Tagak-e Emam Abdollah (also Romanized as Tagak-e Emām ʿAbdollah; also known as Tagak) is a village in Kongor Rural District, in the Central District of Kalaleh County, Golestan Province, Iran. At the 2006 census, its population was 132, in 28 families.

References 

Populated places in Kalaleh County